Elkford is a district municipality in the southeast region of the Canadian province of British Columbia in the Rocky Mountain range. Outdoor recreational activities take place in Elkford throughout the year. Elkford hosts an annual festival called Wildcat Days during the last weekend of June.

The town and area have many kilometres of horse riding, hiking, snowmobiling and cross country ski trails, and a ski hill, Wapiti, run by Elkford resident volunteers. The Elkford Aquatic Centre has a competition-size pool, hot tub and sauna.

There are two public schools Rocky Mountain Elementary School and Elkford Secondary School with a combined student population of 400 in January 2006.

There are five open-pit coal mines within an hour's drive of Elkford: Fording River Operations (FRO), Greenhills Operations (GHO), Line Creek Operations (LCO), Elkview Operations (EVO) and Coal Mountain Operations (CMO). All mines belong to Teck Resources. Elkford was created due to mining activity, in the early 1970s. Many Elkford residents work for the mines or as contractors; other residents work in service industries directly related to the mines. The Fording River Operations (FRO) mine is located on the Continental Divide of the Americas, known as the Great Divide.

A coal seam close to Aldridge Creek, north of Elkford, has been burning for decades and is known to residents of the area as "The Burning Coal Seam."

Demographics 

Religion 
According to the 2021 census, religious groups in Elkford included:
Irreligion (1,530 persons or 55.7%)
Christianity (1,195 persons or 43.5%)
Buddhism (10 persons or 0.4%)
Other (10 persons or 0.4%)

Local media

Radio stations
 99.1 FM - CJDR, Classic Rock
 92.7 FM - CFBZ, Country
 97.7 FM - CBTN, CBC Radio
 106.9 FM - CJAY, Rock
 90.1 FM - ..., Hip-hop/Hits
 93.5 FM rock
 92.9 FM rock
107.9 FM  summit 107

Cable television stations
 Channel 10:  Shaw TV
 Channel 5:  CFCN, CTV
 Channel 13:  CBUT, CBC

In popular culture
Elkford is the setting of Braceface, an animated children's television series that aired in the early 2000s.

See also
Elk
Elk River
Elk Valley
Ktunaxa

References

External links

District municipalities in British Columbia
Elk Valley (British Columbia)
Populated places in the Regional District of East Kootenay